Bel Ami is a novel by Guy de Maupassant.

Bel Ami may also refer to:

Bel Ami (1939 film), a film adaptation of the novel
 Bel Ami (1955 film), a film adaptation of the novel
 Bel Ami (2012 film), a film adaptation of the novel
 BelAmi, a Slovak gay pornographic film studio named after the novel
 Bel Ami (British TV series), 1971 British TV series
 Bel Ami (French TV mini series), 1983 French TV mini series
 Bel Ami (South Korean TV series), also known as Pretty Man, a 2013–2014 Korean TV series

See also

 Belle Amie (disambiguation)
 Bellamy (disambiguation)
 
 Ami (disambiguation)
 Amie (disambiguation)
 Bel (disambiguation)
 Belle (disambiguation)